Fast Five is a 2011 action film. The term may also refer to:

 Fast Five (soundtrack), the soundtrack to the film
 Fast Five (score), the score to the film composed by Brian Tyler
 Dan Auerbach and the Fast Five, a blues-rock group
 Fast Five (consulting), a group of internet consultancies specialized in developing web sites
 Fast-5 Diet, a weight loss diet
 Fast5, a shortened version of netball
 FAST5 format, a variant of the HDF5 format.